Felix Ludwig Johann Friedrich, Prince of Schwarzenberg (2 October 1800 – 5 April 1852) was a Bohemian nobleman and an Austrian statesman who restored the Austrian Empire as a European great power following the Revolutions of 1848. He served as Minister-President of the Austrian Empire and Foreign Minister of the Austrian Empire from 1848 to 1852.

Life
Felix was born at Český Krumlov Castle in Bohemia, the second son of Prince Joseph of Schwarzenberg (1769–1833) and his wife Pauline of Arenberg. The House of Schwarzenberg was one of the most influential Bohemian noble families; his elder brother Prince Johann Adolf II of Schwarzenberg later initiated the building of the Emperor Franz Joseph Railway line from Vienna to Plzeň (Pilsen), while Felix' younger brother Frederick became Archbishop of Salzburg in 1835 and Archbishop of Prague in 1849.

The nephew of Prince Karl Philipp of Schwarzenberg (1771–1820), commander of the Austrian armies in the last phases of the Napoleonic wars, Schwarzenberg after a short military interlude entered the diplomatic service, where he became a protégé of State Chancellor Prince Klemens von Metternich and served in several Austrian embassies at Saint Petersburg, London, Paris, Turin, and Naples. During his time as a London attaché in 1828 he had an affair with Jane Digby, whom he deserted after causing her then-husband – Edward Law, 1st Earl of Ellenborough – to divorce her, and making her pregnant. This episode led to the nickname of "Prince of Cadland" being applied to him in London.

Upon the outbreak of the 1848 Revolutions, he rushed to the Austrian Kingdom of Lombardy–Venetia to join Field Marshal Joseph Radetzky defeating the Italian rebel forces of King Charles Albert of Sardinia in Milan. For his role as a close advisor to Radetzky, as well as his status as brother-in-law to Marshal Prince Alfred of Windisch-Grätz, who had suppressed the Czech "Whitsun Riot" in Prague and the Vienna Uprising in October, Schwarzenberg was appointed Austrian minister-president—the sixth within a year—and foreign minister on 21 November 1848. In these offices, which he both held until his premature death, his first step was to secure the replacement of incapacitated Emperor Ferdinand I of Austria by his nephew Francis Joseph. After heir presumptive Archduke Franz Karl had renounced the succession, Ferdinand abdicated in Olomouc on December 2.

Schwarzenberg formed a new government with conservative politicians like Interior Minister Count Franz von Stadion but also liberal allies like Baron Alexander von Bach, Karl Ludwig von Bruck and Anton von Schmerling as well as the Bohemian federalist Education Minister Count Leopold von Thun und Hohenstein. Learning from Metternich's fate, Schwarzenberg was determined not only to fight, but overcome revolution. Against the perceptions in the Frankfurt Parliament concerning the German question, he advocated the idea of an Austrian-German federation, including all Austrian crown lands in and outside the German Confederation. He delegitimized the Frankfurt assembly by recalling the Austrian delegates and preempted the federalist ideas of the Austrian Kremsier Parliament with the promulgation of the March Constitution in 1849.

Together with the new Emperor, Schwarzenberg called in the Imperial Russian Army to help suppress the Hungarian revolt, and thus give Austria free rein to attempt to thwart Prussia's drive to dominate Germany. He undid democratic reforms and re-established monarchist control in Austria, with the 1849 March Constitution that transformed the Habsburg Empire into a unitary, centralized state. In matters of German dualism, he was able to impose the Punctation of Olmütz on Prussia, forcing it to abandon, for the moment, its plan of unifying Germany under its own auspices, and to acquiesce in the reformation of the old German Confederation. At the same time his government initiated substantial administrative, juridical, and educational reforms.

Schwarzenberg died in office at Vienna, suffering a stroke in the early evening of Monday, April 5, 1852.

Legacy
Schwarzenberg achieved substantial respect in Europe as an able statesman (some called him the "Austrian Bismarck"), although he was not much trusted, even by his emperor. His own statement (or alleged statement: according to historian Edward Crankshaw, it is apocryphal) following the Russian intervention in Hungary, that Austria would "shock the world by the depth of its ingratitude" was bitterly remembered in the Crimean War, a war which had the effect of marring his posthumous reputation. Varying between the ideas of constitutionalism and the revival of an absolute monarchy, Schwarzenberg managed to disappoint both liberal and conservative circles. Nevertheless, his intelligence and powers of application were great; and his sudden death has generally been seen by historians as a grave setback to Austria, given that none of his successors in the emperor's reign possessed his European renown or political skill.

The honorary citizenship of Budapest bestowed on Schwarzenberg during his lifetime was officially revoked in 2011 by the local government under Mayor István Tarlós.

See also
 House of Schwarzenberg

Bibliography 
 Edward Crankshaw, The Fall of the House of Habsburg, 1963.

References

Attribution

External links 
 

1800 births
1852 deaths
19th-century Ministers-President of Austria
People from Český Krumlov
19th-century Austrian people
Austrian Empire politicians
Foreign ministers of Austria
Austrian diplomats
People of the Revolutions of 1848
Felix
Bohemian nobility
German Bohemian people
Austrian people of German Bohemian descent
Knights Cross of the Military Order of Maria Theresa